Bojan Zdešar (born November 30, 1984 in Ljubljana) is a retired male freestyle swimmer from Slovenia, who competed for his native country at the 2004 Summer Olympics. He swam in the long-distance swimming events.

References
sports-reference

1984 births
Living people
Slovenian male freestyle swimmers
Swimmers at the 2004 Summer Olympics
Olympic swimmers of Slovenia
Sportspeople from Ljubljana